Maximilian Korge (born 12 October 1994) is a German rower. He competed in the men's coxless four event at the 2016 Summer Olympics.

References

External links
 

1994 births
Living people
German male rowers
Olympic rowers of Germany
Rowers at the 2016 Summer Olympics
Place of birth missing (living people)